Andrés del Corral (1748–1818) was a Spanish writer and archeologist.

Spanish male writers
19th-century Spanish archaeologists
1748 births
1818 deaths
University of Salamanca alumni
18th-century Spanish archaeologists